The Rolling Stones' 1966 British Tour was a concert tour by the band. The tour commenced on 23 September and concluded on 9 October 1966.

The opening acts were Ike & Tina Turner, the Kings Rhythm Orchestra, the Yardbirds and Peter Jay and The New Jaywalkers.

The Rolling Stones
Mick Jagger - lead vocals, harmonica, percussion
Keith Richards - guitar, backing vocals
Brian Jones - guitar, harmonica, electric dulcimer, organ, backing vocals
Bill Wyman - bass guitar, backing vocals
Charlie Watts - drums

Tour set list
"Paint It, Black"
"Under My Thumb"
"Get Off of My Cloud"
"Lady Jane"
"Not Fade Away"
"The Last Time"
"19th Nervous Breakdown"
"Have You Seen Your Mother, Baby, Standing In The Shadow?"
"(I Can't Get No) Satisfaction"

Tour dates

References

 Carr, Roy.  The Rolling Stones: An Illustrated Record.  Harmony Books, 1976.  

The Rolling Stones concert tours
1966 concert tours
1966 in the United Kingdom
September 1966 events in the United Kingdom
October 1966 events in the United Kingdom
Concert tours of the United Kingdom